Elections to City of Lincoln Council in Lincolnshire, England, were held on 10 June 2004. One third of the council was up for election and the Labour Party stayed in overall control of the council.

After the election, the composition of the council was:
Labour 25
Conservative 7
Liberal Democrat 1

Election result

All comparisons in vote share are to the corresponding 2000 election.

Ward results

Abbey

Birchwood

Boultham

Bracebridge

Carholme

Castle

Glebe

Hartsholme

Minster

Moorland

Park

References

Local elections: East Midlands analysis

2004 English local elections
2004
2000s in Lincolnshire